Penelope Swales is a songwriter, folk singer, instrument maker, legal aid lawyer, and activist based in the Dandenong Ranges in Victoria, Australia. Swales performed at the Poly Pride Day in New York's Central Park in 2007, and toured Europe in 2008 with the band Totally Gourdgeous. She spent much of her early life homeless. Working with musical instrument maker Jack Spira, she began making instruments using the hard shells of gourds similar to kalimbas, and has made and sold many of them. She became a legal aid lawyer.

Discography
 Between Light And Dark, 1993
 Returning on Foot, 1995
 Homemade Wine, 1997
 Live At Woodford, 1998
 Justifying Your Longings to the Doctor, 1998
 Archive: Demos, out-takes and one-offs 1995–2000, 2001
 Monkey Comfort, 2003 
 Archive Vol 2: Songs from the Borderline, 2005
 Skin: Deep – Polymorphous Love Songs, 2007
 Legacy: Two Decades of Topical Songwriting, 2010

Television appearances
Swales appeared on the RMITV show Under Melbourne Tonight in 1996.

References

External links 
 Penelope Swales' official website

Year of birth missing (living people)
Living people
Australian folk musicians
Australian women singers
Australian folk singers